La-related protein 4 is a protein that in humans is encoded by the LARP4 gene. LARP4 is an RNA-binding protein which consists of a La motif (LaM), RNA recognition motif (RRM) and a putative PABP binding motif. It has been shown that LARP4 is involved in mRNA stability.

LARP4 is known to regulate cancer cell migration and invasion by altering cell shape. It is also reported to be a glioma tumor suppressor.

References

Further reading